Undecylic acid (systematically named undecanoic acid) is a carboxylic acid with chemical formula . It is often used as an antifungal agent, to treat ringworm and athlete's foot, for example. Like decanoic acid, it has a distinctive, unpleasant odor.

See also
 List of saturated fatty acids

References

External links 
 

Alkanoic acids
Fatty acids